Yandian is a town under the administration of Yanzhou City in southwestern Shandong province, China, located about  west of downtown Yanzhou. , it has 66 villages under its administration.

See also 
 List of township-level divisions of Shandong

References 

Township-level divisions of Shandong